WADL may refer to:

 WADL (TV), a television station (channel 27, virtual 38) licensed to serve Mount Clemens, Michigan, United States
 Web Application Description Language, an XML-based file format
 Lombok International Airport (ICAO code "WADL") in Lombok, Indonesia